Shopping is a British post-punk trio based in London and Glasgow. Its members are Rachel Aggs (guitar and vocals), Billy Easter (bass guitar and vocals), and Andrew Milk (drums and vocals), who formed the band in November 2012 out of their previous band, Covergirl.

The band released its first album, Consumer Complaints, on 11 April 2013 on Mïlk Records, a record label run by Easter and Milk; it was re-released by FatCat Records in the United States in 2015. Their second album, Why Choose, was released on 2 October 2015 on FatCat Records.

Their third album was The Official Body, which was produced by Edwyn Collins and released on FatCat Records on 19 January 2018.

The band reunited again in the studio in London to record their fourth album, "All or Nothing". The album was recorded over a 10 day period in London with US based producer, Davey Warsop.

History
Shopping released their debut single "In Other Words", recorded at their rehearsal space Power Lunches, in 2013. This was followed by a European tour.

Later that year, the band released its debut album, Consumer Complaints, also on Milk and Easter's MÏLK label.  This was compared to bands like ESG, Delta 5, Talking Heads, and Gang of Four.

The album was released in the U.S. in 2015; later that year, Shopping's second album, Why Choose, arrived via FatCat Records.

Following the second album's release, the band's rehearsal space, Power Lunches, shut down and Milk moved to Glasgow. Shopping adapted, recording their third album with Edwyn Collins at his Clashnarrow studio in the Scottish Highlands.

Their third album The Official Body was released in early 2018.

On 5 December 2019 they announced their fourth album All or Nothing would be released on 7 February 2020.

On 7 February 2020 Shopping released their fourth album on FatCat Records, "All or Nothing", produced by US based producer, Davey Warsop.

Discography

Albums
 Consumer Complaints - Mïlk Records/ FatCat Records, 12" LP, CD, MP3 (2013)
 Why Choose - FatCat Records, 12" LP, CD, MP3 (2015)
 The Official Body - FatCat Records, 12" LP, CD, MP3 (2018)
 All or Nothing - FatCat Records, 12" LP, CD, MP3 (2020)

Extended plays
 Unexpected Item - FatCat Records Limited Edition 12" LP, MP3 Remix EP feat remixes by Carson Cox, Helm, Ela Orleans, Knit Mitten & Apostille

Singles
 "In Other Words" - Mïlk Records, 7" single (2013)
 "Straight Lines" - FatCat Records, 7" single, MP3 (2015)
 "Take It Outside" - FatCat Records, MP3 (2016)
 "Why Wait" - FatCat Records, MP3 (2016)
 "The Hype" - FatCat Records, MP3 (2017)
 "Wild Child" - FatCat Records, MP3 (2018)
"Initiative" - FatCat Records, MP3 (2020)
"For Your Pleasure" - FatCat Records, MP3 (2020)

References

Underground punk scene in the United Kingdom
FatCat Records artists
Post-punk revival music groups
Musical groups established in 2012
Musical groups from London
British musical trios
2012 establishments in the United Kingdom
English post-punk music groups